Let's Get Gold was a British sports entertainment television series. It aired on ITV; consisting of three episodes, and was hosted by Vernon Kay. It was announced on 11 June 2012, that Rio Ferdinand, Freddie Flintoff, Una Healy and Martine McCutcheon were to judge the show.

Background
Over three shows, Let's Get Gold puts 15 sporting teams against each other as they attempt to transform their sport into the most spectacular and entertaining routine.
 
With a prize fund of £100,000 and judged by Rio, Una, Martine and Freddie; the show aims to find groups with the best technique and skill and creativity.

Promotion
On 21 June 2012, host Vernon Kay spoke to Phillip and Holly on This Morning about the show. On 5 July 2012, judge Martine McCutcheon spoke to Lorraine Kelly on her breakfast show Lorraine.

Format
The judging panel is split and vote at the end of each performance, awarding either a bronze, silver or gold. At the end of all the performances, the audience vote to send one team through to the final. No public vote takes place as the show is pre-recorded.

References

External links
 .
 .
 Let's Get Gold on Twitter.

2012 British television series debuts
2012 British television series endings
ITV game shows
Television series by Fremantle (company)
Television shows produced by Thames Television
English-language television shows